Ferrari 512 S is the designation for 25 sports cars built in 1969–70, with five-litre 12-cylinder ("512") engines, related to the Ferrari P sports prototypes. The V12-powered cars were entered in the 1970 International Championship for Makes by the factory Scuderia Ferrari and private teams. Later that year, modified versions resembling their main competitor, the Porsche 917, were called Ferrari 512 M (for modificata). In the 1971 International Championship for Makes, the factory focused on the new Ferrari 312 PB and abandoned the 512 which was only entered by privateers. From 1972 onwards, the 512 (as the 917) was withdrawn from the world championship following a change in the regulations, and some 512s in private hands were entered in CanAm and Interserie races.

Nomenclature
The Ferrari 512 is named for its engine displacement, five litres, and the number of cylinders, 12 (in this case in a V12 configuration).

History
Until 1967, Ferrari raced four-litre prototypes (see Ferrari P), but due to the high speeds it achieved in Le Mans, also by the seven-litre V8 Ford GT40, the rules were changed for 1968 limiting Group 6 prototypes to a maximum engine capacity of three litres, as in Formula One. Despite having a suitable engine, Ferrari sat out the 1968 season, to return in 1969 with the Ferrari 312 P. In that year, Porsche had taken full advantage of a loop hole with the Porsche 917, making the risky investment of building 25 examples of a five-litre car to allow homologation into the FIA's Group 5 sports car category. Selling half of his business to Fiat, Enzo Ferrari raised the funds to match that investment. Surplus cars were intended to be sold to racing customers, which meant that several dozen high powered sports cars were available, and with each requiring two drivers in an endurance race, there was a shortage of experienced pilots.

The engine of the 512 S was a completely new 60° V12 with 560 PS (404 kW) output. Compared to Porsche's air-cooled flat-12, it needed a maze of cooling pipes and a heavy radiator. Since the chassis was of sturded steel, reinforced with aluminium sheet, weight was 100 kg more than that of the alloy-framed 917. Notwithstanding the weight difference and higher center of gravity, the Ferrari 512 S and Porsche 917 seemed fairly evenly matched.

At the beginning of 1970 the Ferrari 512s were hampered by predictable early problems, including a weak suspension and transmission problems, but the fact that Porsche already had six months of equally mixed experiences with its 917 in 1969 would be decisive for the rest of the season.

Contrary to Porsche, Ferrari did not organise an intramural competition. At Porsche, JWA Gulf, KG Porsche Salzburg and later Martini Racing, all received direct factory support. Thus, at least four cars were real works cars, without putting strain on the factory itself, as personnel and funds were provided by these professional teams. And even the privateers like AAW Shell Racing and David Piper Racing received much better support than Ferrari's clients. Ferrari did not adopt this modern scheme, but entered cars themselves in the traditional manner, as "Spa Ferrari SEFAC". Having only a few Formula One drivers under contract in the previous years, with the sports car aces driving for Porsche, Ferrari could barely find qualified drivers for its entries. Besides the factory cars, there were the private cars of Scuderia Filipinetti, NART, Écurie Francorchamps, Scuderia Picchio Rosso, Gelo Racing Team and Escuderia Montjuich. Those private cars never received the same support from the factory. They were considered as field fillers, never as candidates for a win.

At the end of the 1970 season, Ferrari had won the 12 hours of Sebring, while the Porsche 917 and 908 took the remaining nine wins of the championship season. At Le Mans, the Ferrari suffered from reliability problems, although it was considered to be equally fast to the 917. Four 512s were entered by Ferrari for that race, but the Vaccarella/Giunti car was out after seven laps, the Merzario/Regazzoni car was out after 38 laps and the Bell/Peterson car was out a lap later, and about five hours later the Ickx/Schetty car was out after 142 laps. For speed tracks such as Le Mans, Spa, Monza and the Osterrichring, an extra rear body panel designed to suit the 512 better was fitted on the car. The modified 512 M had proven to be fast at the end of the season, and Ickx/Giunti also won the Kyalami non-championship Springbok nine-hours race. As the loop hole for the five litre sports cars became obsolete after 1971, Ferrari decided to abandon factory entries of the 512 in favor of developing a new three litre prototype, the 312 PB. In 1971, Penske entered an improved 512 M (No. 1040) in Sunoco livery which was able to challenge the 917, taking pole position several times.

Cars built

Just in time for the 24h of Daytona, Ferrari in January 1970 presented the required number of 25 512 S, as 17 complete cars and eight assembly kits, to the homologation authorities. Of those cars, fitted with the traditional even chassis numbers, ranging from 1002 to 1050, 19 were raced in 1970, five of them being spyders. Unlike Porsche, which has built over 50 917s in total, Ferrari could not sell off all surplus cars.

The only 512 chassis winning major races in 1970 were Nos. 1026 (Sebring) and 1010 (Kyalami).

Of the 25 cars manufactured for the 1970 season, but not raced that year, the No. 1020 was converted at the end of the season as a 512 M and sold to NART, which entered it in competition in 1971. The No. 1024 remained unsold in 1970, was transformed into a 512 M and sold one year later to the Scuderia Brescia Corse. The No. 1036 was used as test car by the racing division of Ferrari. Later it was sold to Solar Productions for Steve McQueen's Le Mans, also known as French Kiss with Death. Later the no.1036 was converted to an open-top version and raced at Can-Am in 1974.

The 1040, sold to Chris Cord and Steve Earle, was entered in 1971 by Penske at Daytona, Sebring, Le Mans and Watkins Glen, setting the pole positions at the American tracks. The 1048 was sold as a test car to Scuderia Filipinetti but not raced in 1970. The 1050 was sold to Corrado Manfredini (but only as chassis plus body), combined with parts of Nos. 1022 and 1032, transformed into a 512 M and raced in 1971.

Eventually the factory team used nine cars for international endurance racing. The Scuderia Filipinetti (Switzerland, Herbert Müller) and NART raced two cars each. Écurie Francorchamps (Belgian importer of Ferrari), Escuderia Montjuich (Spain), Gelo Racing Team (Germany) and Picchio Rosso raced one car each. After the 1022, bought by the last team, was destroyed at the 24 Hours of Daytona, they would use the 1032.

During the 1970 race season several other Ferraris 512 Ss were destroyed. That was the case with the 1012 spyder after its crash at practice for the ADAC 1000km Nürburgring. The 1026, having been raced as factory car No. 7 by Derek Bell and Ronnie Peterson at the 1970 Le Mans 24 hours, was destroyed during the Le Mans film, by Derek Bell. The 1032 chassis number was subject of controversy in the 1980s, and even Christie's was involved. On the reconversion of the 1032 into a 512 M parts were used to rebuild it on the 1050 chassis.

The drivers of the 512 S factory cars

Compared to Porsche which since the mid-1960s strived to align the top sports car drivers of that era, Ferrari's Mauro Forghieri could not count exclusively on top racers in their quest to win the 1970 International Championship for Makes, as Ferrari had abandoned sports car racing after 1967, save for few entries in 1969. Clay Regazzoni and Jacky Ickx, who had returned from Brabham, were Ferrari's F1 men for 1970, but as endurance racing typically requires two drivers per car, at least six more drivers were needed to enter four cars, to match the four or more Porsche factory-backed entries. Also, Alfa entered factory prototype cars, and competed for drivers.

Starting the season, former Ferrari works driver Pedro Rodríguez had been lost to Porsche's JWA Gulf Racing of John Wyer, and to BRM in F1, while another former works racer, Chris Amon was now involved in F1 with March, just like Mario Andretti.

It was scheduled that Regazzoni, Ickx, Ignazio Giunti, Peter Schetty, Nino Vaccarella and Arturo Merzario should race as many rounds as possible. Only Vaccarella and Schetty were free from F1 obligations. Although fast, they were not such typical all-rounders as Jo Siffert, Brian Redman, Vic Elford, Hans Herrmann and Pedro Rodriguez (of them Siffert raced in F1 for March and Rodriguez raced F1 for BRM, but had not the same heavy testing duties as most other F1 racers), who all could drive, for example, the ultra-fast Spa-Francorchamps in a 917K just as competently as they could drive the twisty, winding Targa Florio course in a 908/03. Ferrari only entered one car in the Targa Florio, driven by Giunti and Vaccarella, whereas Porsche entered 4 cars in the event and won it easily. Although all of the Ferrari drivers were just as capable, they were not as available as the Porsche drivers. Vaccarella was "the man of the rocky mountains" at the Targa Florio and Schetty was the specialist of hillclimbing racing where Porsche was also a dominant factor. Derek Bell and Jackie Oliver were also unavailable at most endurance races, since they drove F1 for Brabham and BRM. John Surtees, who had quit Ferrari in 1966 after an argument with Eugenio Dragoni, returned for the races in Monza, Spa and at the Nürburgring.

Whilst JWA Gulf, KG Salzburg and Martini Racing could count on stable pairings for the whole season, Ferrari's race director Mauro Forghieri had to change his pairings over and over. Eventually his top racer Mario Andretti could only be present for the three American rounds (Daytona, Sebring and Watkins Glen). In total 12 different drivers were seen in 1970 at the wheel of a factory 512 S . Of them the promising Ignazio Giunti did nine of the ten rounds, being only absent at the BOAC 1000 km. Merzario and Vaccarella made seven entries, Ickx and Schetty six of the ten. Only Vaccarella and Surtees were 35 years old or older. Except for Clay Regazzoni (31), all others were younger than 30 years, with Ickx (25), Peterson (26), Merzario (27) and Bell (28). Peterson was only hired for Le Mans, a serious mistake by Forghieri who should have offered him a full year contract.

Another handicap for Ferrari was its full season commitment to F1 racing, so that the 512 S cars did not receive full technical help at all times. Ickx finished second in the F1 World Championship and won three races, while Regazzoni finished third and won once. Both failed to surpass the points tally of late Jochen Rindt, who had a fatal accident during practice for the 1970 Italian Grand Prix.

Of the 12 works racers on Ferrari 512 S in 1970, nine are still alive. Ignazio Giunti was killed in Buenos Aires in January 1971, driving the brand new Ferrari 312PB. He was leading the 1971 1000 km Buenos Aires race when he collided with the Matra which Jean-Pierre Beltoise was attempting to push back to the pits after running out of fuel. Giunti sustained injuries from which he would not survive. Ronnie Peterson, who started his F1 career in 1971, died from injuries that occurred during the 1978 Italian Grand Prix start. Regazzoni, having been paralyzed from the waist down following an accident at the 1980 United States Grand Prix West, died in a car accident in Italy on 15 December 2006.

See also
 Ferrari 512 S Modulo

Notes

References
 http://www.ultimatecarpage.com/car/2181/Ferrari-512-S.html
 https://web.archive.org/web/20080914155606/http://www.imca-slotracing.com/Ferrari%20512S.htm
 3D model animation of 1970 long-tailed version on Youtube.com

External links

512
Sports prototypes
Can-Am cars
Group 4 (racing) cars